RMC is a private French-Monégasque radio station created in 1943, broadcasting from France with studios in Paris and Monte-Carlo. RMC stands for Radio Monte-Carlo.

History

Radio Monte-Carlo was created on 1 July 1943.

In 1950 Radio Monte-Carlo became one of 23 founding broadcasting organisations of the European Broadcasting Union.

Since 1995, the Monegasque membership has been held by Groupement de Radiodiffuseurs Monégasques (GRMC), a joint organisation by Monaco Media Diffusion (MMD), Radio Monte-Carlo (RMC) and Télé Monte-Carlo (TMC).

References

External links

RMC Live

Radio stations in France
Radio in Paris
Mass media in Monaco
1943 establishments in France
Longwave radio stations
Radio stations established in 1943
European Broadcasting Union members
News and talk radio stations